was a Japanese runner who won the 1500 metres event at the 1927 and 1930 Far Eastern Championship Games. He competed at the 1928 and 1932 Olympics in the marathon and finished in fifth and sixth place, respectively.

References

External links
 

1906 births
1991 deaths
Japanese male middle-distance runners
Japanese male long-distance runners
Japanese male marathon runners
Olympic male marathon runners
Olympic athletes of Japan
Athletes (track and field) at the 1928 Summer Olympics
Athletes (track and field) at the 1932 Summer Olympics
Japan Championships in Athletics winners
Kansai University alumni
20th-century Japanese people